Caldicochlea is a genus of freshwater molluscs in the family, Tateidae, endemic to the mound springs of the Great Artesian Basin. 

The genus name was published in 1997 by Winston Ponder to replace the preoccupied name Dalhousia given in 1996 to this genus by Ponder, Colgan, Terzis, Clark & Miller. The name derives from the Latin: caldus (warm, hot - referring to the hot spring habitat) and cochlea (snail). 

Species of this genus are found at Dalhousie Springs  in large warm (33-42°C) pools or warm outflows and in the shallow spring edges on rocks and wood.

There are two species of snail in this genus:
Caldicochlea globosa 
Caldicochlea harrisi

References

 Bank, R. A. (2017). Classification of the Recent freshwater/brackish Gastropoda of the World. Last update: January 24th, 2018. OpenAccess publication.

External links 

 Australian Freshwater Molluscs. Revision 1A: Caldicochlea Ponder, 1997 (full description)

Tateidae
Taxa named by Winston Ponder